Freeman Hopkins was a Quaker and the first settler of Ontario, New York. He and his wife Martha Patterson, daughter of Charles Patterson and Martha Hall, came to Ontario in the Spring of 1806 from Rhode Island. In 1807 the town of Ontario was founded from a part of the neighboring town of Williamson, and was originally called "Freetown" after Mr. Hopkins.

During the War of 1812 Hopkins left the area and returned to Rhode Island due to the Quakers testimony against participation in wars, and to avoid the hostilities that took place on Lake Ontario. In 1818 the family returned to Ontario.

Martha Patterson Hopkins was born in Mount Washington, Berkshire County, Massachusetts about 1785.

Freeman Hopkins built the first sawmill in the town, and his daughter, Melissa's birth on May 7, 1806, was the first in Ontario. He later went on to father a total of nine children. Sadly, Freeman Hopkins came to an unfortunate end. After becoming blind in his later years, he drowned himself in his cistern.

References 
 
 

American Quakers
Year of birth missing
Year of death missing
People from Ontario, New York
Suicides by drowning in the United States
American blind people